Vishniac may refer to:

People
 Ethan Vishniac (born 1955), American astrophysicist
 Roman Vishniac (1897–1990), Russian-American photographer and biologist
 Wolf V. Vishniac (1922–1973), American microbiologist who died during an expedition to Antarctica

Places
 Vishniac (crater), a crater on Mars, named after Wolf V. Vishniac
 Vishniac Peak, in Antarctica, named after Wolf V. Vishniac